Saint Emygdius (Latin: Emidius, Æmedius, Emigdius, Hemigidius; ; c. 279 – c. 309 AD) was a Christian bishop who is venerated as a martyr.  Tradition states that he was killed during the persecution of Diocletian.

Legend
His legend states that he was a pagan of Trier who became a Christian.  He traveled to Rome and cured the paralytic daughter of his host Gratianus, who had let him stay with him at his house on Tiber Island.  Gratianus' family then converted to Christianity.

Emygdius also cured a blind man.  The people of Rome believed him to be the son of Apollo and carried him off by force to the Temple of Aesculapius on the island in the Tiber, where he cured many of the sick.  Emygdius declared himself a Christian, however, and tore down the pagan altars and smashed into pieces a statue of Aesculapius.  He also converted many to Christianity; this enraged the prefect of the city.

He was made a bishop by Pope Marcellus I (or Pope Marcellinus), and sent to Ascoli Piceno.

On his way to Ascoli, Emydgius made more conversions, and performed a miracle where he made water gush out of a mountain after striking a cliff.  Polymius, the local governor, attempted to convince Emygdius to worship Jupiter and the goddess Angaria, the patroness of Ascoli.  Polymius also offered him the hand of his daughter Polisia.  Instead Emygdius baptized her as a Christian in the waters of the Tronto, along with many others.

Enraged, Polymius decapitated him on the spot now occupied by the Sant'Emidio Red Temple, as well as his followers Eupolus (Euplus), Germanus, and Valentius (Valentinus).  Emygdius stood up, carried his own head to a spot on a mountain where he had constructed an oratory  (the site of the present-day Sant'Emidio alla Grotte).  After Emygdius' martyrdom, his followers attacked Polymius' palace and pulled it down.

Veneration
His hagiography was written probably by a monk of Frankish origin in the eleventh century, after the rediscovery of the saint's relics, which had been conserved in a Roman sarcophagus.  However, his hagiography was attributed to his disciple Valentius, who was martyred with him.  The cult of Saint Emygdius is ancient, documented by churches dedicated to him since the eighth century.  The translation of his relics from the catacomb of Sant'Emidio alla Grotte to the crypt of the cathedral happened probably around the year 1000 under Bernardo II, bishop of Ascoli Piceno.

In 1703, a violent earthquake occurred in the Marche but did not affect the city of Ascoli Piceno.  The city's salvation was attributed to Emygdius and he was thenceforth invoked against earthquakes. As a result of this event, the church dedicated a church to the saint in 1717.  Additionally, many towns appointed him as patron, erecting statues in his honor in the churches (L'Aquila, 1732; Cingoli, 1747; San Ginesio, 1751; and Nocera Umbra, 1751).

Emygdius is considered to have protected Ascoli from other dangers.  A dazzling vision of Emygdius is said to have deterred Alaric I from destroying Ascoli in 409.  The troops of Conrad II, Holy Roman Emperor passed through the region in 1038 carrying the plague; Bernardo I, bishop of Ascoli, invoked Emydgius' aid and the plague stopped.  During World War II, on October 3, 1943, Emygdius is said to have protected the city against German movements against the Italian partisans.

Gallery

Notes

External links

 Saint Emygdius
 Catholic Online: Emygdius
 Emygdius
 EMIDIUS
 SAINT EMIDIO AND THE PATRON'S FEAST THROUGH THE CENTURIES
  Sant’Emidio: Vescovo e martire
  Sant'Emidio
  Emygdius
 

Bishops in le Marche
People from Trier
4th-century Italian bishops
279 births
309 deaths
4th-century Christian martyrs
4th-century Romans
Cephalophores
Converts to Christianity from pagan religions